Ashley Charles, better known as his pseudonym, Sabrepulse, is an English chiptune musician from Kingston upon Hull, England. He is often cited as being one of the pioneers of the genre known as chipbreak, a fusion of 8-bit music and breakcore.

He founded Sabrepulse in late 2001 to release his remixes of retro game music.

Discography

Albums
 Says Hello (2004)
 Famicom Connection (2005)
 Chipbreak Wars (2006)
 Verão (2007)
 Turbo City (2008)
 Untitled (2009)
 Blood Eagle (2015)
 Paragon (2015)
 Exile (2018)

EPs
 Terra EP (2005)
 Titan EP (2006)
 Nintendokore EP (2006)
 First Crush EP (2011)
 Bit Pilot OST (2011)
 Ender (2022)

Singles
 "Close To Me" (2011)

Remix albums
 Blood Eagle (The Remixes) (2015)

Other
 "We Are Hi-Speed" on GDTK Sampler (2006)
 Xinon VS Sabrepulse: Realization (2007)
 "Lightspeed Disco" on Crunchy Records Compilation 2008 (2008)
 "Digital Love" on Da Chip Volume 2 (2012)

Compilations
 Terra & Titan (2014)

Remixes

Production credits

References

External links
Bandcamp

Living people
Chiptune musicians
Musicians from Yorkshire
English electronic musicians
21st-century English musicians
Year of birth missing (living people)